People with the name Isabel Maria include:
 Infanta Isabel Maria of Braganza (1801–1876)
 Isabel Maria de Alcântara, Duchess of Goiás (1824-1898)
 Princess Isabel Maria of Braganza (1894–1970)